Patricia Jackson DeCoursey (28 December 1932 - 1 January 2022) was a leading researcher in the field of chronobiology. Her research focused on behavioral, physiological, and ecological aspects of mammalian circadian rhythms. She is credited with creating the first Phase Response Curve (PRC).  PRC’s are used throughout the field today to help illustrate the change of a biological oscillation in response to an external stimulus.  She worked as a biology professor at the University of South Carolina (USC) from 1967 until her retirement as director of the W. Gordon Belser Arboretum in 2019.

Biography
At an early age, DeCoursey expressed much interest in nature. She became fascinated with the outdoors though traveling with her father, a physician, and the rest of her family to remote wilderness areas  While attending Hunter College High School in New York City she began collecting data on the songbirds of a hardwood forest in Long Island. She mapped the number and location of the birds as well as their distinctive calls. She entered this project in  the 1950 Westinghouse Science Talent Search and was named a finalist along with her twin sister Cynthia (Jackson) Fisher.

Education
DeCoursey's interest in ornithology led her to Cornell University, where she received a degree in zoology in 1954.  She met George DeCoursey at Cornell University, where he was a student at the time. She married George DeCoursey in 1954. DeCoursey furthered her education at the University of Wisconsin, Madison where she earned a Ph.D. in zoology and biochemistry.  She did postdoctoral research with Jürgen Aschoff at the Max-Planck Institute for Behavioral Physiology in Erling-Andech, Germany for two years. She then continued her research at Washington State University,

Career
She was a distinguished professor of biology at University of South Carolina, researching mammalian circadian rhythms since she moved there with her husband in 1966.

Contributions to chronobiology

Phase Response Curve
Decoursey is credited with the first published Phase Response Curve (PRC). The relevant paper was about flying squirrels kept in constant darkness and how they would respond to different pulses of light at different times of the day.  The compilation of this data produced the first PRC.

Mammalian Entrainment System
DeCoursey was the first scientist to show that the mammalian clocks can be reset by light pulses. She also showed that the photoreceptive system responsible for entrainment is different from the system involved in visual image perception.

Adaptive Value
DeCoursey helped the scientific world understand the adaptive value of the mammalian biological clocks (found within the suprachiasmatic nucleus (SCN)). From April 1997-October 1998 she set up an enclosure for approximately 74 chipmunks. 30 chipmunks had lesions in their SCN, 24 others were surgical control and 20 others were intact controls. After 80 days she showed that the majority of the chipmunks killed by predators had lesions in their SCN. This gave evidence to support that having a mammalian circadian clock is a favorable trait that has been naturally selected for. 
In an outdoor enclosure, DeCoursey released white-tailed antelope ground squirrels which had various levels of SCN lesioned.  The squirrels displaying the most activity during the night had the highest amount of lesioning.  This research has helped further our understanding of sleep related issues affecting humans such as jet lag or insomnia.

Recent research
Her recent research focused on the physiological and behavioral aspects of circadian rhythms. She studied how the retina moves in response to the daily rhythm. Also, as mentioned above, her work on chipmunks helped uncover the adaptive value of the circadian clock in the wild. She has done experiments related to the adaptive value of clocks on antelope squirrels and golden-mantled squirrels. This research furthers our understanding of sleep-related issues affecting humans such as jet lag or insomnia.

Other achievements
DeCoursey received the 2011 South Carolina Environmental Awareness Award for re-foresting the W. Gordon Belser Arboretum at the University of South Carolina, a ten-year initiative she led, as well as for various small gardens around the university. The arboretum is designated as an outdoor field classroom and laboratory for UofSC undergraduates, and it is also used for conducting a variety of educational outreach programs. According to an article in Scientific American, DeCoursey “spends half her work time on the restoring the arboretum and organizing class visits, and the other half on her professorial duties.” 

Decoursey was a member of the original Organizing Committees for both the Journal of Biological Rhythms and the Society for Research on Biological Rhythms (SRBR). She was an active member on the Advisory Board for both groups and served two terms as SRBR’s Secretary.

DeCoursey was one of the activists who worked to create what is now the Congaree National Park.

Selected publications

DeCoursey PJ (1989) Photoentrainment of circadian rhythms: An ecologist’ viewpoint In Circadian Clocks and Ecology, T Hiroshige and K Honma, eds, pp 187–206, Hokkaido University Press, Sapporo.

References

External links
Vanderbilt’s summary of PRC
DeCoursey’s Textbook: Summary & About the Authors

Living people
21st-century American biologists
Chronobiologists
Cornell University alumni
University of Wisconsin–Madison College of Letters and Science alumni
University of South Carolina faculty
1932 births